Kristin Rowe-Finkbeiner is an American author, speaker, radio host, co-founder and the executive director/CEO of MomsRising.org and board president of the MomsRising Education Fund. In May 2006 Joan Blades and Rowe-Finkbeiner co-founded MomsRising.

Biography
Kristin Rowe-Finkbeiner is the host of "Breaking Through with Kristin Rowe-Finkbeiner - Powered by MomsRising" that airs on 1480AM in Washington, D.C., the 7th largest media market in the country, and also airs on other stations across the nation on the WeAct Radio Network, TuneIn's Progressive Voices Network, as well as on iTunes as a podcast.

In 2005 Rowe-Finkbeiner wrote The F-Word: Feminism in Jeopardy which was awarded first place by the Independent Book Publishers Association in the category of Women's Issues in 2005.

Rowe-Finkbeiner is married to former Republican Washington State Senator Bill Finkbeiner. They live in Washington state with their two children.

Honors and awards
 Independent Book Publishers Association Award, Women's Issues (2005) for The F-Word: Feminism in Jeopardy
 Rockwood Institute Leadership Fellowship (2008)
 Hunt Alternatives Fund's Prime Movers: Cultivating Social Capital Fellowship (2008)
 Washington State League of Women Voters Good in Government Award (2008)

References

External links
 MomsRising.org

Living people
21st-century American women writers
American feminist writers
Year of birth missing (living people)